Lovers' Lane is a 1924 American silent romantic comedy film based upon the play by Clyde Fitch and directed by Phil Rosen. It stars Robert Ellis and Gertrude Olmstead.

Plot
As described in a review in a film magazine, when Dr. Singleton (Ellis) tells his sweetheart, Mary Larkin (Olmstead), that even though he loves her he will not surrender his practice in their small New England town, she becomes peeved and encourages a stranger. Dr. Stone (Periolat), an old-timer and anti-modern method practitioner, has told a divorcee that her lame child is incurable. Singleton takes them both into his home and is successful in his operation upon the youngster. Mary decides to marry Woodbridge (Kent), the stranger, and calls upon Singleton’s father (MacGregor), a local minister, to perform the ceremony. Tom is a witness, and when the divorcee (Dale) is also called it develops that she divorced Woodbridge for non-support. Seeing his child Dick (Guerin) reunites Woodbridge and his former wife, and after that Dr. Singleton has everything his own way.

Cast

Box-office
According to Warner Bros records the film earned $182,000 domestically and $19,000 foreign.

Preservation status
Warner Bros. records of the film's negative have a notation, "Junked 12/27/48" (i.e. December 27, 1948). Warner Bros., destroyed many of its nitrate negatives in the late 1940s and 1950s due to the decomposition of its pre-1933 films. No prints of Lover's Lane are known to exist and it is now considered to be a lost film.

References

External links

Still at silenthollywood.com

1924 films
1924 romantic comedy films
American romantic comedy films
American silent feature films
American black-and-white films
Films directed by Phil Rosen
Films directed by William Beaudine
Warner Bros. films
Lost American films
1920s American films
Silent romantic comedy films
Silent American comedy films